Cheshmeh Borjali (also Romanized as Cheshmeh Borj‘alī and Cheshmeh-ye Borj ‘Alī; also known as Dūl Kabūd) is a village in Veysian Rural District, Veysian District, Dowreh County, Lorestan Province, Iran. At the 2006 census, its population was 47, in 12 families.

References 

Towns and villages in Dowreh County